Richard Broughton, alias Rouse, (ca. 1558 in Great Stukeley, Huntingdonshire – 18 January 1634) was a Catholic priest and antiquarian.

Life
Broughton claimed descent form the Broughtons of Lancashire. He was ordained at Reims on 4 May 1593 and soon after returned to England. John Pitts, a contemporary, says that he "gathered a most abundant harvest of souls into the granary of Christ" and eulogizes his attainments in being "no less familiar with literature than learned in Greek and Hebrew". Broughton became an assistant to the archpriest, a canon of the chapter, and vicar-general to Richard Smith, Bishop of Chalcedon. He also claims recognition for his influence on the study of antiquity; having earned, partly by his work and partly through controversy, the right to honourable mention with Henry Spelman, Edward Reyner, William Dugdale, and other well-known antiquarians.

Works
Broughton's chief works are:

An Apologicall Epistle, serving as preface to a Resolution of Religion, signed R. B. (Antwerp, 1601)
The first part of the Resolution of Religion By R. B. (Antwerp, 1603), often mistaken for Robert Persons's Resolution (i.e. The first booke of the Christian exercise, appertayning to Resolution).
A New Manuall of old Christian Catholick Meditations (1617), dedicated to Anne of Denmark
The Judgment of the Apostles (Douai, 1632), dedicated to Queen Henrietta Maria and directed against Rogers on the Thirty-nine Articles
Ecclesiasticall Historie of Great Britaine (Douai, 1633), dedicated to the Duchess of Buckingham and the Countess of Rutland
A True Memorial (London, 1650), published by G. S. P(riest) after Broughton's death. The 1654 edition is entitled Monasticon Britannicum

Broughton also wrote on the antiquity of the world, Sterlingorum (Hearne, II, 318, 381); on the alleged conversion (1621) of John King, Bishop of London; and A Relation of the Martyrdom of Nicholas Garlick.

He died according to Anthony à Wood, 15 Kal. Feb. 1634 (i.e. 18 January 1634).

Bibliography
Wood, Anthony à, Fasti, ed. Bliss (London, 1815), I, 428
Dodd, Charles, Church History, ed. Tierney (Brussels, 1742), III, 87
Pitts, John, De Rebus Anglicis, 815
Foley, Henry, The Records of the English Province of the Society of Jesus (London, 1880), VI, 181
Hurter, Hugo von, Nomenclator litterarius theolgiae catholicae (Innsbruck, 1871), I, 657
Gillow, Joseph, Bibliographical Dictionary of the English Catholics (London, 1885), I, 318

Attribution

1550s births
1634 deaths
English antiquarians
17th-century English Roman Catholic priests
16th-century English writers
16th-century male writers
17th-century English writers
17th-century English male writers
People from Huntingdonshire